Lake Howell High School is a comprehensive four-year high school in Central Florida, US.
The school is in Seminole County with a Winter Park, Florida address.

The school's first principal, Richard L. Evans, was the first African-American principal in Seminole County since schools were integrated in the late 1960s.

Notable alumni

Joshua Dawkins 'Malik Blade",WWE NXT Superstar
Brian Acton, co-founder of WhatsApp and Signal Foundation
Nick Calathes, NBA and international basketball player 
Pat Calathes, basketball player for Israeli Basketball Super League, 2013 Israeli Basketball Premier League MVP
Sierra Deaton, co-winner of 2013 season of The X Factor as part of duo Alex & Sierra
Mike Gogulski (1990), activist and hacker who voluntarily made himself stateless in 2008
Tam Hopkins, former NFL guard
Christian Jones, linebacker for Detroit Lions
Tao Lin, author
Jamie Linden, screenwriter, producer and director 

Brandon Marshall, NFL wide receiver
Dream (A.k.a Clayton Huff), Minecraft youtuber
Dave Martinez, former MLB player who now manages the Washington Nationals and coached them to their first World Series Championship in 2019
Kawika Mitchell, former NFL linebacker for Buffalo Bills
Chandler Parsons, former NBA player
Scott Porter, actor
Nandi Pryce, former soccer player
Trevor Pryce, former NFL defensive end for Denver Broncos and Baltimore Ravens
Chuck Scott, former NFL wide receiver
Marquette Smith, former NFL running back
Eddie Taubensee, MLB pro baseball player
Dahvie Vanity (2003), lead vocalist of electronic group Blood on the Dance Floor

References

External links
Seminole County Public Schools
Lake Howell High School

Seminole County Public Schools
High schools in Seminole County, Florida
Winter Park, Florida
Public high schools in Florida
Educational institutions established in 1975